Jabbowal is a village in Shaheed Bhagat Singh Nagar district of Punjab State, India. The village is administrated by Sarpanch an elected representative of the village.

Demography 
As of 2011, Jabbowal has a total number of 384 houses and population of 1914 of which 984 include are males while 930 are females according to the report published by Census India in 2011. The literacy rate of Jabbowal is 75.86%, higher than the state average of 75.84%. The population of children under the age of 6 years is 174 which is 9.09% of total population of Jabbowal, and child sex ratio is approximately 977 as compared to Punjab state average of 846.

Most of the people are from Schedule Caste which constitutes 44.93% of total population in Jabbowal. The town does not have any Schedule Tribe population so far.

As per the report published by Census India in 2011, 575 people were engaged in work activities out of the total population of Jabbowal which includes 529 males and 46 females. According to census survey report 2011, 94.96% workers describe their work as main work and 5.04% workers are involved in Marginal activity providing livelihood for less than 6 months.

Education 
The village has a Punjabi medium, co-ed upper primary school founded in 1975. The school provide mid-day mealas per Indian Midday Meal Scheme. The school provide free education to children between the ages of 6 and 14 as per Right of Children to Free and Compulsory Education Act.

Transport 

See also 
List of villages in India

References

External links 
 Tourism of Punjab
 Census of Punjab
 Locality Based PINCode

Villages in Shaheed Bhagat Singh Nagar district